The Delhi Board of School Education (DBSE) is a state-level board of education of Delhi.It was established in 2021 by the Chief Minister of Delhi, Arvind Kejriwal. Currently, there are 31 schools in Delhi called SoSE (School of Specialized Excellence) that are affiliated to the DBSE. These schools that are affiliated to DBSE provide education in different fields. There are 12 schools for STEM , 7 schools for Humanities, 4 schools for "Performing & Visual Arts", 7 schools for "High End 21st Century Skills" and 1 school for Armed Forces training (Armed Forces Preparatory School).

History 

DBSE was approved by the cabinet of Delhi on 6 March 2021 and was officially registered on 19 March 2021. On 11 August 2021, International Baccalaureate signed an MoU with government of Delhi. On 13 August 2021, DBSE was recognised by COBSE (Council Of Boards of School Education) which allowed DBSE to conduct exams and grant certificates.

References 

Education in Delhi